Billinge Hill, also known as Billinge Lump, is in the Metropolitan Borough of St Helens in North West England. It lies in Billinge, within the historic county boundaries of Lancashire, and it is one of the 176 hills graded as a Marilyn in England.

A beacon tower is at the summit. Built as a summerhouse to Winstanley Hall in the 18th century, it was used for the Year 2000 celebrations. Most fireworks displays for miles around can be seen from the summit and people often gather there in small numbers to watch displays over the towns of Wigan and St Helens and the local village of Rainford. Over the years it has been covered in graffiti which was recently cleaned off and the metal panels restricting access to the inside of the beacon have been painted black.

Nearby to the north-west are several large transmitter masts which take advantage of the height and relative isolation of the land. The views are fairly extensive, notably to the southwest where, when clear, the mountains of Snowdonia, in Wales, can be seen and to the northeast Winter Hill can be seen. Looking east one sees Manchester and the Derbyshire Peak District.

The beacon itself was used for aircraft observation during and after the war. The bunker would have been used to monitor the location of nuclear blasts and the resulting fallout over Lancashire in the event of nuclear war. The post opened in January 1960 and closed in October 1968.

References

External links
Visit St Helens - Billinge Hill - Tourist information regarding Billinge Hill

Marilyns of England
Metropolitan Borough of St Helens
Highest points of English counties